Applied Optics is a peer-reviewed scientific journal published by The Optical Society three times a month. It was established in 1962 with John N. Howard as founding editor-in-chief and Patricia Wakeling as Managing Editor. Wakeling worked on the journal for over three decades. The journal covers all aspects of optics, photonics, imaging, and sensing. According to the Journal Citation Reports, the journal has a 2021 impact factor of 1.905.

References

External links 
 

Optics journals
Optica (society) academic journals
English-language journals
Publications established in 1962
Journals published between 27 and 51 times per year